The 2007 Louisiana–Lafayette Ragin' Cajuns football team represented the University of Louisiana at Lafayette in the 2007 NCAA Division I FBS football season. The Ragin' Cajuns were led by sixth-year head coach Rickey Bustle and played their home games at Cajun Field. The Ragin' Cajuns finished the season with a record of 3–9 overall and 3–4 in Sun Belt Conference play.

Preseason

Award Watchlist

Sun Belt Media Day

Preseason All-Conference Team

Offense
RB Tyrell Fenroy
OT Jesse Newman

Special Teams
PK Drew Edmiston

Roster

Schedule

Source: RaginCajuns.com: 2007 football schedule

Game summaries

@ South Carolina

Ohio

McNeese State

Troy

@ UCF

North Texas

@ Arkansas State

Florida Atlantic

@ Tennessee

@ Middle Tennessee

@ Florida International

Louisiana-Monroe

Postseason

All–Conference Team 

First-Team Offense
RB Tyrell Fenroy
OL Jesse Newman

First-Team Defense
DE Rodney Hardeway

Second-Team Offense
C Chris Fisher

Second-Team Defense
Antwyne Zanders

Second-Time Special Teams
K Drew Edmiston
AP Michael Desormeaux

Honorable Mentions
LB Grant Fleming
DL Corey Raymond

Post-Season Awards 
Rusty Smith, FAU - Player of the Year
Omar Haugabook, TROY - Offensive Player of the Year
Tyrell Johnson, ARST - Defensive Player of the Year
Chris Bradwell, TROY - Newcomer of the Year
Giovanni Vizza, UNT - Freshman of the Year
Howard Schnellenberger, FAU - Coach of the Year

References

Louisiana-Lafayette
Louisiana Ragin' Cajuns football seasons
Louisiana-Lafayette Ragin' Cajuns football